Jaana Pelkonen (born 27 January 1977) is a Finnish member of parliament and television presenter.

Career
Pelkonen's media career started as a radio presenter for Radio 99 in Lahti in 1995–1997. She became famous in Finland as the host of the video gaming show Tilt in 1997–2005 and the youth program Jyrki in 1998. In 2001–2002 she hosted an entertainment travel show called FarOut. She has also hosted the Finnish qualifications of the Eurovision Song Contest for five years. On 12 May 2007 Pelkonen hosted the Eurovision Song Contest 2007 together with Mikko Leppilampi. She also gave the Finnish votes in the Eurovision Dance Contest 2008 held in Glasgow, Scotland which was the second ever Dance Contest.

She earned her master's degree in Political Science from Helsinki University in 2007, after graduation she worked as an assistant for the Finnish Minister of Communications Suvi Lindén.

Pelkonen received attention in Finland when she took part in the 2008 local elections. She was elected to Helsinki City Council with 3,518 votes, the 15th highest vote total in the nation. She was also the highest ranking celebrity amongst the candidates for local councillors. She was further elected to the Finnish parliament in 2011 representing the National Coalition Party.

In 2015 parliamentary election Pelkonen got the highest vote total in Helsinki and the highest vote total of all female candidates in the nation. She was re-elected in 2019 parliamentary election with 10,563 votes. In February 2020, Pelkonen announced that she would not run in the next parliamentary election.

In autumn 2018, Pelkonen competed in Dances with Stars, the Finnish version of the dance contest Strictly Come Dancing, and placed sixth.

Electoral history

Municipal elections

Parliamentary elections

See also
 List of Eurovision Song Contest presenters

References

External links

 Jaana Pelkonen's official website

1977 births
Living people
People from Lahti
National Coalition Party politicians
Members of the Parliament of Finland (2011–15)
Members of the Parliament of Finland (2015–19)
Members of the Parliament of Finland (2019–23)
Finnish female models
Finnish television presenters
Finnish women television presenters